Won't Back Down is a 2012 American drama film directed by Daniel Barnz and starring Maggie Gyllenhaal, Viola Davis and Holly Hunter.

Premise 
Two determined mothers, a car dealer/bartender (Maggie Gyllenhaal) and a teacher (Viola Davis), look to transform their children's failing inner city school in Pittsburgh. Facing a powerful and entrenched bureaucracy and corruption from the teachers' union president (Holly Hunter) and the school's principal (Bill Nunn), they risk everything to make a difference in the education and future of their children.

Cast

Production

Background 

The film is loosely based on the events surrounding the use of the parent trigger law in Sunland-Tujunga, Los Angeles, California in 2010, where several groups of parents attempted to take over several failing public schools. The Parent Trigger law, which was passed in California and other states in 2010, allowed parents to enforce administrative overhaul and overrule administrators in under-performing public schools if petitioned.  If successful, petitions allow parents to direct changes such as dismissal of staff and potential conversion of a school to a charter school.

Release 
Walden Media, a film studio which released a 2010 documentary film Waiting for "Superman" with Paramount Pictures and Participant Media about the  American educational system, produced the film, with 20th Century Fox releasing it on September 28, 2012. American actresses Maggie Gyllenhaal and Viola Davis were among the first to be cast, with Academy award-winning actress Holly Hunter being cast later on. The film marked Hunter's first film appearance in seven years since The Incredibles and The Big White. The film's trailer was released on May 17, 2012.
The film's budget was $25 million, not counting the undisclosed amount for marketing the film.

Promotional campaign
Private foundations and the U.S. Chamber of Commerce contributed more than $2 million for a publicity campaign for the film. Television ads, bookmarks, websites and private screenings a six-month cross-country tour promoted the film. Promoters scheduled private screenings in states from New York to Georgia and Utah, to promote the movie and its parent trigger message. Michelle Rhee presented the film at separate events near both the Republican and Democratic Party 2012 national conventions several weeks before its theatrical release.

Reception

Box office
The film grossed just $5.3 million at the box office domestically, and, according to Box Office Mojo, had the worst opening-weekend performance of any film to open in more than 2,500 theatres - collecting just $1,035 per screen, until the record was broken by Victor Frankenstein in 2015.

Critical response
On Rotten Tomatoes, the film has an approval rating of 35% based on 106 reviews with an average rating of 5.10/10. The site's critical consensus reads: "Despite the best efforts of its talented leads, Won't Back Down fails to lend sufficient dramatic heft or sophistication to the hot-button issue of education reform." On Metacritic the film has a weighted average score of 42% based on reviews from 34 critics, indicating "mixed or average reviews". Audiences surveyed by CinemaScore gave the film a grade "A−" on scale of A to F.

Variety called the film a "heavy-handed inspirational drama" that "grossly oversimplifies the issue at hand." The site continued, "Barnz's disingenuous pot-stirrer plays to audiences' emotions rather than their intelligence, offering meaty roles for Maggie Gyllenhaal as a determined single mom, and Viola Davis as the good egg among a rotten batch of teachers, while reducing everyone else to cardboard characterizations. Absent high-profile champions, femme-centric pic could suffer from low attendance." 
Roger Ebert of the Chicago Sun-Times wrote: "Both the lottery scene and the anti-union material seem to be fictionalized versions of material in the powerful documentary Waiting for Superman which covered similar material with infinitely greater depth."
Michael Medved liked the film, giving it three and a half stars (out of four) and calling it "... one of the better films of 2012."

Controversy
Some critics have contended that the film is an ideological vehicle of conservative activist Philip Anschutz and that the film is slanted to promote the parent trigger movement. Some critics have contended that the movie shows a watered-down version of what parents are really up against when trying to implement the Parent Trigger law.

Accolades
Viola Davis won the NAACP Image Award for Outstanding Actress in a Motion Picture for her role as Nona Alberts; and she was nominated for a Black Reel Award for Best Actress for her role.

See also 
 Education in the United States
  Waiting for "Superman"
  The Lottery

Home media
Won't Back Down was released on DVD and Blu-ray on January 15, 2013.

References

External links 
 
 
 

2012 films
20th Century Fox films
American drama films
2010s female buddy films
Films scored by Marcelo Zarvos
Films about educators
Films about school violence
Drama films based on actual events
Films directed by Daniel Barnz
Films set in Pittsburgh
Films shot in Pittsburgh
Walden Media films
2010s high school films
American high school films
2012 drama films
2010s English-language films
2010s American films